The 1918 Newcastle-upon-Tyne by-election was a parliamentary by-election held on 13 May 1918 for the House of Commons constituency of Newcastle-upon-Tyne in the historic county of Northumberland.

Vacancy
The by-election was caused by the appointment of the sitting Liberal MP Edward Shortt, as Chief Secretary for Ireland. He succeeded Henry Duke  who resigned the post in response to the announcement by Prime Minister David Lloyd George on 9 April of Irish conscription. Shortt had come to Lloyd George's attention when he made a success of chairing a select committee set up to review the difficult subject of the general administration of the Military Service Acts. Under the Parliamentary rules of the day applicable to the appointment of ministers, Shortt had to resign and fight a by-election.

Candidates
As the sitting member, Shortt was selected to fight the by-election for the Liberals. As participants in the wartime coalition the Conservatives agreed not to contest the by-election, although they did so deploring the fact that Shortt had recently voted not to apply the Military Service Acts to Ireland.

The result
No other candidate came forward to contest the election and Shortt was returned unopposed.

The votes

References

See also
List of United Kingdom by-elections (1900–1918)

Newcastle-upon-Tyne by-election
By-elections to the Parliament of the United Kingdom in Northumberland constituencies
Elections in Newcastle upon Tyne
Newcastle-upon-Tyne by-election
Unopposed ministerial by-elections to the Parliament of the United Kingdom in English constituencies
20th century in Newcastle upon Tyne
Newcastle-upon-Tyne by-election